In Ottoman classical music, usul is an underlying rhythmic cycle that complements the melodic rhythm and sometimes helps shape the overall structure of a composition. An usul can be as short as two beats or as long as 128 beats. Usul is often translated as "meter", but usul and meter are not exactly the same. Both are repeating rhythmic patterns with more or less complex inner structures of beats of differing duration and weight. But a student learning Turkish music in the traditional meşk system first memorizes the usul kinetically by striking the knees with the hands. The student then sings the vocal or instrumental composition while performing the underlying usul. This pedagogical system helps the student memorize the composition while internalizing the underlying rhythmic structure.

Usul patterns have standard pronounceable vocables built from combinations of the syllables düm, dü-üm, tek, tekkyaa, teke, te-ek, where düm, dü-üm indicate a strong low beat of single or double duration, and tek, tekkya, teke, te-ek indicate various combinations of light beats of half, single or double duration. Long usuls (e.g., 28/4, 32/4, 120/4) are compound metric structures that underlie longer sections of entire compositions. 

In Ottoman times, the usul was realized by drummers. Drums are generally omitted in modern performances except for Mevlevi. When performing music for the Mevlevi ceremony, drummers traditionally play embellished (velveleli) versions of the usuls.

Instrumental improvisations (taksim) and vocal improvisations (gazel, mersiye, etc.) are generally performed in "free" rhythm, with no usul.

The melodic counterpart to usul rhythmic mode is makam melodic mode. The parallel system to usul in Indian music is tala.

Usul

Usuls based on number of beats per bar
2-) Nimsofyan
3-) Semâî
4-) Sofyan 
5-) Zafer, Türk Aksağı (Süreyya)
6-) Yürüksemâî, Sengin Semaî , Ağır Semai
7-) Devr-i Hindî, Devr-i Turan (Mandra), Devr-i Aryân
8-) Düyek, Ağırdüyek, Katakofti (Müsemmen)
9-) Aksak, Ağır Aksak, Oynak, Evfer, Ağır Evfer, Bulgar Darbı (Darbıbulgar), Çiftesofyan (Raksaksağı)
10-) Aksaksemaî, Ağır Aksaksemaî
12-) Frenkçin
13-) Nimevsat
14-) Devrirevan
16-) Nimhafîf 
32-) Hafîf, Muhammes 
88-) Darbıfetih

Additional usuls
 Gülşen
 Arabesk
 Alaturka
 Özgün
 Semah
 Vahde
 Sebare
 Sufi
 Azəri 
 Baqu havaları
 Şeyhin Samil
 Qaşgay
 Artık Aksaksemaî
 Türk Aksaksemaîsi
 Arab Aksaksemaîsi
 Aksak Sofyan
 Kadîm Evfer
 Romanlı8/9
 Rumeli8/9
 Nimevfer
 Çiftetelli
 Misket
 Ankara havaları
 Kaşık
 Halay
 Ağrı
 Deliloy
 Durakevferi 
 Firengi Fer'
 Fer'
 Türk Darbı (1. Şekil) 
 Türk Darbı (2. Şekil)
 Türk Darbı (3. Şekil)
 Türk sanat müziği 2/4
 Türk sanat müziği 4/4
 Türk sanat müziği 4/6
 Türk sanat müziği 6/8
 Türk Halk müziği 4/4
 Türk Halk müziği 5/8
 Türk Halk müziği 8/9
 Türk Halk müziği 9/10
 Uzun havaları
 Oyun havaları
 Düğün havaları
 Hünerdarb
 Tekvuruş
 Karadeniz
 Ormancı
 Trabzon
 Horon
 Laz
 Raksan
 Arap Oryantal
 Türk Oryantal
 Aksak Semaî Evferi
 Hefta
 Nimdevir
 Mevlevi Devrirevani
 Dolap
 Devritürkî
 Darbıarabî
 Nazlı Devrihindî
 Devrikebîr 
 Evsat
 Dilruba 
 Yörük Ali
 Fahte
 Lenkfahte (Nimfahte) 
 Şirin 
 Hezeç 
 Harzem 
 Çenber 
 Ağır Çenber 
 Nimberefşan 
 Berefşan
 Nimsakîl
 Sakîl
 Remel
 Havî
 Zencîr 
 Zeybek
 Darbeyn
 Karşılama
 Harmandalı
 Bektaşîraksı
 Darbıkürdî

See also
Rhythm in Arabian music
Rhythm in Persian music

External links
 Rhythmic layers in Turkish art music

Asian rhythm
Turkish music
Turkish words and phrases
Ottoman classical music
Turkish makam music